Alexander Monro may refer to:
Alexander Monro (educator), Principal of the University of Edinburgh, 1685–1690
 Alexander Monro (primus) (1697–1767), Scottish physician, founder of Edinburgh Medical School
 Alexander Monro (secundus) (1733–1817), son of previous, Scottish physician and medical educator
 Alexander Monro (tertius) (1773–1859), son of previous, Scottish physician, Professor of anatomy

See also
 Alexander Munro (disambiguation)
 Monro Family (Physicians)